San Andres (also San Andres Bukid, bukid being the Tagalog for "farm" or "[rice] field")  is a district of Manila, Philippines. San Andres shares the Estero Tripa de Gallina as its western and northern border with the districts of Malate and Paco, respectively and Pedro Gil and Tejeron streets to the east with the district of Santa Ana. It borders the cities of Pasay and Makati in the south. The area is under the jurisdiction of the Fifth Congressional District of Manila, and includes the Manila South Cemetery, an exclave of the city surrounded by land administered by Makati.

Profile 
Although San Andres has only a small land area, it is the most densely populated district in Manila, as of 2015, surpassing even Tondo. San Andres is divided into its eastern and western sectors by the Osmeña Highway. Mostly residential, San Andres also has some sections classified as commercial. 

The majority of the district's population live just above the poverty line, mostly composed of post-World War II settlers from various provinces while the original inhabitants were middle or lower-class migrant families who had formerly settled in Tondo but found the rough working-class lifestyle less suitable for raising children. The influx of settlers into the district was unregulated, resulting in a lack of urban planning as evidenced by irregular buildings, narrow roadways, and large blocks of houses accessible only through meter-wide alleyways.

Barangays 
San Andres has 65 barangays.

History
What is now San Andres Bukid was carved from the pre-World War II district of Singalong as well as parts of Santa Ana, Malate, and Paco districts. Singalong district is largely absorbed into San Andres and is commemorated by a namesake street that runs perpendicular to Quirino Avenue and parallel to Taft Avenue. The street lies west of what is now the western section of San Andres. Elderly residents of Singalong believe that the area's name was derived from a Tagalog word for a cup fashioned from bamboo.

In the Spanish colonial era, Spaniards awarded the area to members of the Capuchin missionaries who thereafter converted the native population to Catholicism. In the aftermath of the Second World War, the southern section of Manila was devastated as with most of the city. San Andres was then mostly open space, and it was repopulated by migrants from nearby provinces and the Visayas.

San Andres Street

San Andres Street is a road in the city of Manila. It starts from Augusto Francisco Street in San Andres. It traverses the neighborhoods of Rubi, Coral, and Nakar. It crosses .

It was bisected by Taft Avenue in front of Quirino Avenue LRT Station. It continues at the intersection of Quirino Avenue and traverses the Malate streets of Pilar Hidalgo Lim, Guerrero, Maria Orosa Avenue, Adriatico Street, Mabini, and Del Pilar Street.

Intersections

References 

"By Sword and Fire: The Destruction of Manila in World War II, 3 February-3 March 1945" by Alphonso J. Aluit (1994) Bookmark, Inc. © 1994 National Commission for Culture and the Arts 
 San Andres Manila Volunteer Fire Brigade Inc., History by Charles Chua, Callsign San Andres 1, Presently President and Brigade Fire Marshall

External links 

 Official Website of Manila

 
Districts of Manila